Michael Holmes may refer to:

 Michael Holmes (politician), former leader of the United Kingdom Independence Party
 Michael Holmes (journalist), British television presenter and writer
 Michael Holmes (broadcaster) (born 1960), Australian anchor on CNN
 Michael Holmes (saxophonist) (born 1982), American classical saxophonist
 Michael Holmes (whistleblower) (born 1965), U.S. Army National Guard whistleblower
 Mike Holmes (born 1963), Canadian builder/contractor and TV personality
 Mike Holmes (wide receiver) (born 1950), played for several teams in the NFL, CFL, and USFL
 Michael W. Holmes, professor of Biblical Studies and Early Christianity, Bethel University
 Micky Holmes (born 1965), English footballer
 Mike Holmes (politician), member of the Alabama House of Representatives
 James M. Holmes (born 1957), known as Mike, U.S. Air Force general

See also
 Michael (disambiguation)
 Holmes (disambiguation)
 Michelle Holmes (born 1967), British actress
 Mitch Holmes (born 1962), Kansas politician
 Mike Holm (1876–1952), Minnesota politician
 Michael Holm (born 1943), German musician